Oncideres amputator is a species of beetle in the family Cerambycidae. It was described by Johan Christian Fabricius in 1792, originally under the genus Lamia. It is known from the Caribbean Islands. It feeds on Eucalyptus and Inga ingoides.

References

amputator
Beetles described in 1792